Shamsabad (also Romanized as Shamsābād) is a village in Mahvelat-e Jonubi Rural District, in the Central District of Mahvelat County, Razavi Khorasan Province, Iran. At the 2006 census, its population was 950, in 256 families.

References 

Populated places in Mahvelat County